The Decoration for Services to the Red Cross (Ehrenzeichen für Verdienste um das Rote Kreuz) was an Austro-Hungarian award instituted on 17 August 1914 by Emperor Franz Josef I to mark the 50th anniversary of the Geneva Convention. It was intended to honour individuals who had worked in the voluntary emergency services of the Red Cross, either in peacetime or in war.

The order consists of four classes, as well as an associated medal in two classes:
1st: Star
2nd: Merit Cross, 1st class
3rd: Officer's Cross
4th: Merit Cross, 2nd class
Silver Medal
Bronze Medal

Awards for military services was augmented with a war decoration for the ceremony.

Red Cross
Medals of the International Red Cross and Red Crescent Movement
1914 establishments in Austria-Hungary
Awards established in 1914